Entertainment News is a flagship television news Entertainment program formatting infotainment which contains interesting news from the world of entertainment at home and abroad based on facts and information that broadcasts on the Indonesian TV station NET. This program also discusses news from the world of music, film, fashion, art, biography and event organizers. And this program has the motto "No Gossip", this is in accordance with the contents of the programs.

Entertainment News was created on 18 May 2013, by Gista Putri and Wishnutama. To greet all viewers, every articles reading always begins with "Good People" (best people), not "Pemirsa" (viewer) till present. Entertainment News is created with many crews, with other crews including Wishnutama, Roan Y. Anprira, Agus Lasmono Sudwikatmono and Gista Putri.

Entertainment News has won 2 times Indonesian Broadcaster Commissions Awards (Anugerah Komisi Penyiaran Indonesia) on 2015 & 2016.

Programs 
 Access Hollywood (Syndication from, United States)
 Dish Nation (Syndication from, United States)
 Entertainment Tonight (Syndication from, United States)
 E! News (E!, United States)
 The Gossip Table (VH1, United States)
 Melodi (TV3, Malaysia)
 Pop TV Express/POP TV (NTV7, Malaysia)
 Hlive (Astro Ria and Astro Ria HD, Malaysia)
 MeleTOP (Astro Ria and Astro Ria HD, Malaysia)

Hosts 
 Shafira Umm
 Temmy Rahadi
 Caesar Gunawan
 Aubry Beer
 Maria Sabta
 Ganindra Bimo
 Deva Mahenra

Former hosts 
 Dominique Diyose
 Gista Putri (now begin roles at sitcom The East)

Achievements and nominations

References

External links 
 NET. Official Websites
 Entertainment Latest News

Indonesian television news shows
2013 Indonesian television series debuts
2010s Indonesian television series
NET (Indonesian TV network) original programming